Statistics of Japan Soccer League for the 1984 season. No promotion/relegation series for both division were held due to expansion of both divisions in the following season.

First Division
No relegation took place due to expansion to 12 clubs.

Yomiuri was invited to the revived Asian Club Championship, but withdrew.

Second Division
No relegation took place due to expansion to 12 clubs.

References
Japan - List of final tables (RSSSF)

Japan Soccer League seasons
1
Jap
Jap